NAOP may stand for:

 National Academy of Psychology, Indian professional organisation
 National Association of Operative Plasterers, former British trade union